A number of nations have a Seventh Army:

Germany
 7th Army (German Empire), a World War I field army
 7th Army (Wehrmacht), a World War II field army

Russia/Soviet Union  
 7th Army (Russian Empire)
 7th Army (RSFSR)
 7th Army (Soviet Union)

Others
 Seventh Army (France)
 Seventh Army (Italy)
 Seventh Army (Ottoman Empire)
 7th Army (Austria-Hungary)
 Seventh United States Army
 7th Army (Kingdom of Yugoslavia)
 Seventh Army (Nationalist China)